The 2017 Campeonato Nacional Clausura Scotiabank  was the 100th Chilean League top flight, in which Universidad de Chile won its 18th league title.

Standings

Results

Top goalscorers

Source: Soccerway

References

External links
ANFP 

2016–17 Campeonato Nacional season
2016–17 in Chilean football
2017 in South American football leagues
Primera División de Chile seasons